Poquelin is a surname. Notable people with the surname include:

Jean-Baptiste Poquelin (1622–1673), French playwright, actor, and poet
Collège Jean-Baptiste-Poquelin

French-language surnames